Dermiscellum is a genus of lichenized fungi in the family Caliciaceae.

References

Teloschistales
Lichen genera
Caliciales genera
Taxa named by Josef Hafellner